Anton Dedaj (born 14 April 1980) is a Croatian retired football player. The midfielder played for NK Istra 1961 in Croatia. He holds dual Albanian and Croatian citizenship.

Club career
He started his career in Croatia at a young age.  He played in the Slovenian first League with FC Koper in 2003–04.

References

External links
 skflamurtari Official profile 
 
 soccerterminal

1980 births
Living people
Sportspeople from Prizren
Croatian people of Kosovan descent
Croatian people of Albanian descent
Kosovo Albanians
Association football midfielders
Croatian footballers
HNK Šibenik players
NK Čakovec players
NK Zadar players
FC Koper players
NK Osijek players
Örebro SK players
Flamurtari Vlorë players
NK Croatia Sesvete players
NK Istra 1961 players
NK Jadran Poreč players
Croatian Football League players
Slovenian PrvaLiga players
Allsvenskan players
Croatian expatriate footballers
Expatriate footballers in Slovenia
Croatian expatriate sportspeople in Slovenia
Expatriate footballers in Sweden
Croatian expatriate sportspeople in Sweden
Expatriate footballers in Albania
Croatian expatriate sportspeople in Albania
Kosovan expatriate footballers
Kosovan expatriate sportspeople in Slovenia
Kosovan expatriate sportspeople in Sweden
Kosovan expatriate sportspeople in Albania